Municipal elections were held in the Canadian province of Manitoba on October 24, 2018. Mayors, councils and school board trustees were elected.

Selected mayoral and council results are as follows:

Brandon
Results for the city of Brandon are as follows:

Mayor

Brandon City Council

By-election
A by-election was held in Meadows-Waverly Ward on May 5, 2021 to replace John LoRegio who resigned in March 2021. Sunday Frangi was elected, and is believed to be the first Black Canadian councillor in Mantioba's history. Also of note was that the turnout was just 2.6%.

Results

Brokenhead
Results for reeve in the Rural Municipality of Brokenhead are as follows:

Reeve

Dauphin
Results for mayor in Dauphin are as follows:

Mayor

East St. Paul
Results for mayor in the Rural Municipality of East St. Paul are as follows:

Mayor

Flin Flon
Results for mayor in Flin Flon are as follows:

Mayor

Gimli
Results for mayor in the Rural Municipality of Gimli are as follows:

Mayor

Hanover
Results for reeve in the Rural Municipality of Hanover are as follows:

Reeve

La Broquerie
Results for reeve in the Rural Municipality of La Broquerie are as follows:

Reeve

Macdonald
Results for reeve in the Rural Municipality of Macdonald are as follows:

Reeve

Morden
Results for mayor in Morden are as follows:

Mayor

Portage la Prairie (city)
Results for mayor in the city of Portage la Prairie are as follows:

Mayor

Portage la Prairie (RM)
Results for reeve in the Rural Municipality of Portage la Prairie are as follows:

Reeve

Rhineland
Results for reeve in the Municipality of Rhineland are as follows:

Mayor

Ritchot
Results for mayor in the Rural Municipality of Ritchot are as follows:

Mayor

Rockwood
Results for reeve in the Rural Municipality of Rockwood are as follows:

Reeve

Selkirk
Results for mayor in Selkirk are as follows:

Mayor

Springfield
Results for reeve in the Rural Municipality of Springfield are as follows:

Reeve

St. Andrews
Results for mayor in the Rural Municipality of St. Andrews are as follows:

Mayor

Stanley
Results for reeve in the Rural Municipality of Stanley are as follows:

Reeve

St. Clements
Results for mayor in the Rural Municipality of St. Clements are as follows:

Mayor

Ste. Anne (RM)
Results for reeve in the Rural Municipality of Ste. Anne are as follows:

Reeve

Steinbach
Results for mayor in the city of Steinbach are as follows:

Mayor

Taché
Results for mayor in the Rural Municipality of Taché are as follows:

Mayor

The Pas
Results for mayor in the town of The Pas are as follows:

Mayor

Thompson
Results in Thompson were as follows:

Mayor

City Council

West St. Paul
Results for mayor in the Rural Municipality of West St. Paul are as follows:

Mayor

Winkler
Results for mayor in the city of Winkler are as follows:

Mayor

Winnipeg

Results in Winnipeg were as follows:

Mayor

City Council 
''Results for Winnipeg City Council were as follows:

Ballot question

References

External links
Results website

Municipal elections in Manitoba
2018 elections in Canada
2018 in Manitoba
October 2018 events in Canada